Rhipsalis sulcata is a species of plant in the genus Rhipsalis and family Cactaceae. It is endemic to Brazil.  Its natural habitats are subtropical or tropical moist lowland forests and rocky areas. It is threatened by habitat loss.

References

sulcata
Endemic flora of Brazil
Data deficient plants
Taxonomy articles created by Polbot